Sekolah Menengah Agama Persekutuan Bentong (SMAP Bentong), usually known as SUPERB (derived from Sekolah Agama Persekutuan Bentong) is the seventh residential school (Sekolah Berasrama Penuh) in Pahang Darul Makmur, Malaysia. It is Pahang's first Sekolah Menengah Agama Persekutuan (SMAP) and Malaysia's third, after Sekolah Menengah Agama Persekutuan Labu and Sekolah Menengah Agama Persekutuan Kajang. SUPERB was the first residential school which implemented the Ministry of Education's Tahfiz Model Ulul Albab program (in 2014), in which students undergo the Tahfiz program with five years of study.

History 

Construction of SM Agama Persekutuan Bentong began on 10 April 2008, and was completed in October 2011 at a total cost of RM 56.6 million. The acronym SUPERB was coined by Khairil Azwar Razali, the school's first head of its English-language department. SMAP Bentong began operation on 11 June 2012, with 20 teachers, eight staff members, and its initial batch of students. The following year, SM Agama Persekutuan Bentong received two more batches: Predominate 1317 and Valours 1314. With the three batches, SMAP Bentong received several awards and certificates.

Location 

SMAP Bentong is in the FELDA settlement of Mempaga. The nearest towns are Karak and Bentong, 30 minutes away by road.

Motto 

The school's motto is "Melangkaui Kecemerlangan" ("Exceeding excellence"). It was suggested by Khairil Azwar Razali when he coined its acronym, SUPERB

School principles 

SM Bentong emphasizes three main principles: agama (religion), ilmu (knowledge) and amal (good deeds). The integration of these three principles is considered vital.

Badge 

The school badge has a black-and-white background, reflecting the state colors of Pahang. The image of the Quran on a rehal indicates SM Bentong's religious affiliation as Malaysia's third Sekolah Menengah Agama Persekutuan (SMAP). The atomic symbol reflects the integration of science and information and communications technology (ICT) in the curriculum. The ivory (gading) color indicates student aspirations to pursue their studies to the university level and the students' spirituality, strength, optimism and quality. The school principles (agama, ilmu and amal) are at the badge's center.

Song 

The school song is in Malay:
<blockquote><poem>
Menjunjung tinggi wawasan Al-Quran,
Penuh inspirasi menjadi terbilang,
SMAP Bentong SUPERB nilai pendidikan,Ilmu dijana untuk umat cemerlang,(chorus)Keteguhan ilmu, iman dan amal,Keupayaan pendidik berwawasan,Obor insan sepanjang zaman,SMAP Bentong SUPERB terus ke hadapan,Berdiri bangsa kerana ilmuwan,SMAP Bentong SUPERB menyahut cabaran,Modal insan penuh ketakwaan,Untuk generasi masa hadapan.(repeat chorus)
</poem></blockquote>

 Subjects 

 Lower form (forms 1–3) 

Malaysian
English
Mathematics
Science
Islamic studies
Geography
Quran
Arabic
Technology
Computer science
Music
Foreign language (Mandarin Chinese, French or Japanese)

 Upper form (forms 4–5) 

A science stream (Aliran Sains Tulen Agama) is included for form 4 and 5 students. The subjects are:
Malaysian
English
Mathematics (standard and advanced)
Science
Physics
Chemistry
Biology
Islamic studies
Arab
Quran
Foreign language

All subjects except foreign language are assessed on the Sijil Pelajaran Malaysia (SPM) examination.

 Tahfiz Model Ulul Albab 

The Tahfiz Model Ulul Albab (TMUA), which was implemented at SMAP Bentong in 2014, is a combination of the national curriculum (Kurikulum Kebangsaan) and Tahfiz Integrated Curriculum (Kurikulum Bersepadu Tahfiz, or KBT). It has three approaches:
 Quranic: Enables students to memorize all 30 chapters (juzu') of the Quran and understand its contents in five years of secondary-school study.
 Encyclopedic: Provides a foundation for students to master a variety of sciences and languages, making the students a reference source for their peers.
 Ijtihadik: Produces students who can express opinions to solve problems, maximizing creative higher-order thinking skills (HOTS). Students can participate in extra-curricular activities such as horseback riding, swimming and archery.

The implementation of the TMUA) in selected schools, under the supervision of the Education Ministry, is expected to produce 10,920 students who have memorized the Quran by 2021. It will provide an alternative to parents who want their children to be huffaz'' and hold professional positions.

References

External links
  

Boarding schools in Malaysia
Fully Residential Schools (Malaysia)